Groningen Europapark (abbreviation: Gerp) is an unstaffed railway station in Groningen in the Netherlands. It is situated on the Harlingen–Nieuweschans railway between Groningen and Kropswolde and on the Meppel–Groningen railway between Haren and Groningen. It was opened in 2007 and rebuilt in 2012. Local train services are operated by Arriva and Nederlandse Spoorwegen.

Location 
It is near the Euroborg football stadium.

The station is situated on the Harlingen–Nieuweschans railway between the railway stations of Groningen and Kropswolde, and on the Meppel–Groningen railway between the railway stations of Haren and Groningen.

History 
The part of the Harlingen–Nieuweschans railway between Groningen and Nieuweschans was opened in 1868 and the Meppel–Groningen railway was opened in 1870. Groningen Europapark was opened with a temporary station on 1 October 2007. Since the opening, train services on the Harlingen–Nieuweschans railway are provided by Arriva and on the Meppel–Groningen railway by the Nederlandse Spoorwegen. A new permanent station was opened on 10 December 2012.

Building 
The station was designed by Nienke van de Lune and Peter Heideman.

Train services

Bus services

References

External links 
 
 Groningen Europapark station, station information

2007 establishments in the Netherlands
Infrastructure completed in 2012
Buildings and structures in Groningen (city)
Transport in Groningen (city)
Railway stations in Groningen (province)
Railway stations on the Staatslijn B
Railway stations on the Staatslijn C
Railway stations opened in 2007
Railway stations in the Netherlands opened in the 21st century